The Round Barn near Paulding, Ohio, listed on the U.S. National Register of Historic Places simply as Round Barn, is in the area of Paulding, Ohio.  It is a round barn that was built in 1911.  It may also have been known as William Sinn Round Barn.

It was owned originally or at some later date by Ohio Wesleyan University. It was one of six round barns in the Black Swamp area of northwest Ohio that were nominated for NRHP listing together. The listed area for this one, as for several of the others, was just the area of the barn itself plus 50 feet extended out, so making a  diameter circular area.

The barn was listed on the National Register of Historic Places in 1980.

Unfortunately, this barn is no longer standing.

William Sinn was one of the trustees of the barn property.

See also
List of round barns

References 

Buildings and structures completed in 1911
Paulding County, Ohio
Barns on the National Register of Historic Places in Ohio
Buildings and structures in Paulding County, Ohio
National Register of Historic Places in Paulding County, Ohio
Round barns in Ohio